The 1960–61 season was the 13th season of competitive football in Israel and the 35th season under the Israeli Football Association, established in 1928, during the British Mandate.

Review and Events
 The national team competed in the 1960 AFC Asian Cup, hosted in South Korea. The team came out second after winning two matches and losing one, to eventual winners, South Korea.
 In the 1962 World Cup qualification, Israel was drawn in the European Zone, into Group 7. The group was played in a knockout stage on a home-and-away basis. Israel defeated Cyprus in the first round and then Ethiopia in the second round, to advance to the zonal final, against Italy, which was played in October 1961.

Domestic leagues

Promotion and relegation
The following promotions and relegations took place at the end of the season:

Promoted to Liga Leumit
 Hapoel Tiberias

Promoted to Liga Alef
 Beitar Netanya
 Maccabi Ramla

Promoted to Liga Bet
 Hapoel Kfar Blum
 Hapoel Beit HaShita
 HaCarmel Club Haifa
 Hapoel Bat Yam
 Hapoel Ya'akov Kfar Saba
 Hapoel Ein Karem
 Hapoel Sderot
 Hapoel Bnei Zion

Relegated from Liga Leumit
 Beitar Tel Aviv

Relegated from Liga Alef
 Hapoel Hadera
 Hapoel Herzliya

Relegated from Liga Bet
 Hapoel Geva
 Beitar Binyamina
 Hapoel Karkur
 Hapoel Dora Netanya
 Hapoel Kiryat Shalom 1
 Hapoel Zichronot
 Maccabi Gedera
 Hapoel Gedera

1. Hapoel Kiryat Shalom merged with Hapoel HaDarom Tel Aviv and remained, as part of the merged club, in Liga Bet.

Domestic cups

Israel State Cup
The 1958–59 Israel State Cup started during the previous season, but was carried over the summer break and finished with the final on 19 November 1959, in which Maccabi Tel Aviv defeated Hapoel Petah Tikva 4–3.

On 30 January 1960, the next season's competition began, and once again carried over to the next season.

National Teams

National team

1960 AFC Asian Cup

1960–61 matches

 
Seasons in Israeli football